= Jan Cobus =

Flemish tapestry weaver

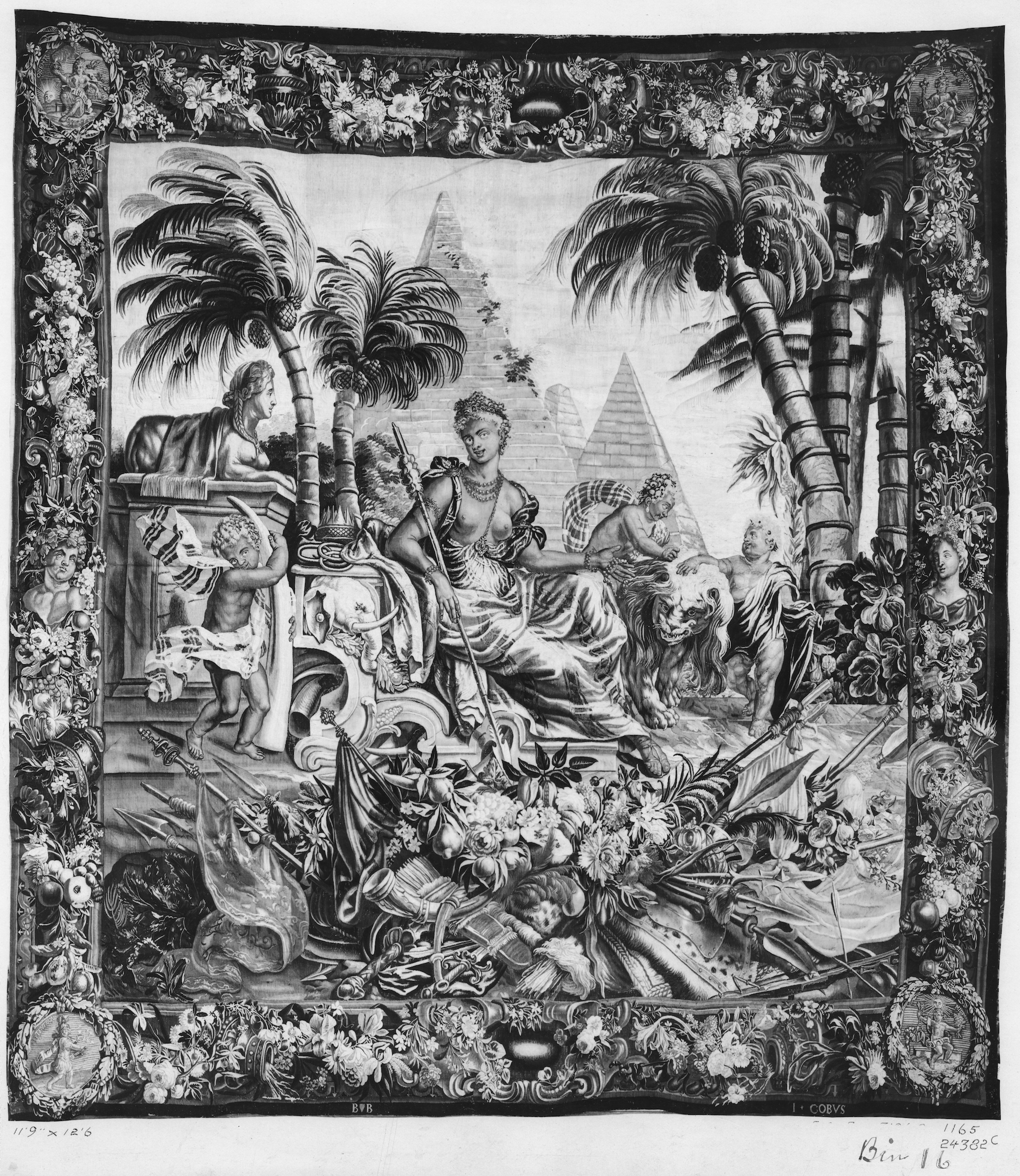
Tapestry titled Africa by Jan Cobus, circa 1675–1700.

Jan Cobus was a 17th century Flemish tapestry weaver.

His work is included in the collections of the Seattle Art Museum, the Rijksmuseum, Amsterdam and the Getty Museum, Los Angeles.
